Tullia is an Ancient city and former bishopric in Numidia and present Latin Catholic titular see.

History 
The city, near modern Annaba (Algeria) was important enough in the Roman province of Numidia to become a suffragan bishopric.

Titular see 
The diocese was nominally restored in 1933 and has had the following incumbents, both of the lowest (episcopal) and intermediary (archiepiscopal) ranks:
 Titular Bishop Joost van den Biesen, White Fathers (M. Afr.) (later Mr.) (1948.02.12 – 1958.01.24)
 Titular Bishop Roman Andrzejewski (1981.11.12 – 2003.07.07)
 Titular Archbishop Georges-Marie-Martin Cottier, Dominican Order O.P. (2003.10.07 – 2003.10.21), later Cardinal)
 Titular Bishop Luis Morao Andreazza, Friars Minor (O.F.M.) (2003.11.12 – 2007.04.21)
 Titular Bishop Franco Giulio Brambilla  (2007.07.13 – 2011.11.24)
 Titular Bishop João Justino de Medeiros Silva (2011.12.21 – 2017.02.22), Auxiliary Bishop of Belo Horizonte.
 Titular Bishop John-Nhan Tran (2023.1.23 – present), Auxiliary Bishop of Atlanta

References

External links 
 GigaCatholic with titular incumbent biography links

Catholic titular sees in Africa
Former Roman Catholic dioceses in Africa
Roman towns and cities in Algeria